Kateryna Oleksandrivna Kalytko (Ukrainian Катерина Олександрівна Калитко; born 8 March 1982 in Vinnytsia, Ukraine) is a Ukrainian writer and translator. She won the 2017 Joseph Conrad Literature Prize.

She studied at National University of Kyiv-Mohyla Academy. She is published by Meridian Czernowitz. She founded the Intermezzo Short Story Festival.

Works 
Short Stories
 M(h)ysteria 
 The Land of All Those Lost, or Creepy Little Tales,
 
Poetry
 Посібник зі створення світу [World Creation Guide]. Vinnytsia 1999.
 Сьогоднішнє завтрашнє [More today, more tomorrow]. Kyiv 2001.
 Портретування асфальту [asphalt portrayal]. Kyiv 2004.
 Діалоги з Одіссєем [dialogues with Odysseus]. Kyiv 2005.
 Сезон штормів [Stormy Season]. Kyiv 2013.
 Катівня. Виноградник. Дім [Torture rack, vineyard. House]. Lviv 2014.
 Ніхто нас тут не знає, і ми - нікого [Nobody knows us here - and we (know) nobody]. Chernivtsi 2019.
 Орден мовчальниць [Order of the Silent Women]. 2021
 Люди з дієсловами [People with verbs].2022

References 

1982 births
Ukrainian poets
Living people